These are the results for the 2005 edition of the Paris–Tours cycling classic. Erik Zabel equalised the three-wins record of riders such as Guido Reybrouck.

Final classification

09-10-2005: St. Arnould en Yvelines–Tours, 254 km.

External links
Race website

2005 in French sport
2005 UCI ProTour
2005